Joanna Korner  (born 1 July 1951) is a British judge of the International Criminal Court.

Legal career
Korner was called to the Bar at Inner Temple in 1974, following study at the Inns of Court School of Law, now The City Law School in London. From 1975–1993, Korner was a practising barrister at 6 King's Bench Walk, London undertaking criminal work both as the prosecution and defence. In 1993, Korner was made a Queen's Counsel and became a recorder in the Crown Court of England and Wales in 1994 undertaking serious criminal cases including fraud, murder, serious sexual offences and other grave crimes. In 1999, Korner became a senior prosecuting trial attorney at the Office of the Prosecutor at the International Criminal Tribunal for the former Yugoslavia. In 2012, Korner became a judge of the Crown Court. In 2014, Korner was appointed to the specialist fraud court presiding over trials of public interest involving hacking, insider trading, multimillion-pound scams and large-scale theft.

International Criminal Tribunal for the former Yugoslavia
From 1999–2004, Korner was a Senior Prosecuting Trial Attorney for at the Office of the Prosecutor at the International Criminal Tribunal for the former Yugoslavia trying high-level leaders charged with breaches of international humanitarian law. She was the lead prosecutor in two trials of political and military leaders: Prosecutor v. Radoslav Brđanin and Momir Talić, and Prosecutor v. Milomir Stakić. From 2009–2012, Korner led in the prosecution in trial of Prosecutor v. Mićo Stanišić and Stojan Župljanin.

Legal work in Bosnia and Herzegovina

Since 2004, Korner has worked closely with the judiciary of Bosnia and Herzegovina. From 2004–2005, Korner was Senior Legal Adviser to Chief Prosecutor of Bosnia and Herzegovina during establishment of War Crimes Section. In 2006, Korner was the Bosnia and Herzegovinian counsel in the International Court of Justice case of Bosnia and Herzegovina v. Serbia and Montenegro.

Korner has written numerous reports, supported by the Organization for Security and Co-operation in Europe, on the state of war crimes processing in Bosnia and Herzegovina. Korner's 2016 report entitled “Processing of War Crimes at the State Level in Bosnia and Herzegovina" was adopted by High Judicial and Prosecutorial Council of Bosnia and Herzegovina in January 2017. A follow-up report was publish in 2020.

International Criminal Court

In 2019, Korner was nominated to be the United Kingdom's candidate for the 2020 judicial elections of the International Criminal Court based in The Hague, Netherlands. In December 2020, Judge Korner was elected to serve as a Judge of the International Criminal Court, for the term 2021-2030. She was elected in the first round.

In March 2021, Korner was officially sworn in as a Judge of the International Criminal Court.

Honours
In 2004, Korner was appointed Companion of the Order of St. Michael and St. George (CMG) for services to international law.

References

External links
Judge Korner's official campaign website
Website of the International Criminal Tribunal for the former Yugoslavia
UK Government webpage on the UK candidate for the International Criminal Court (ICC) elections 2020: Judge Joanna Korner

1951 births
Living people
British women judges
20th-century English judges
21st-century English judges
Members of the Inner Temple
Companions of the Order of St Michael and St George
20th-century women judges
21st-century women judges
Alumni of the Inns of Court School of Law